1982 Women's Nordic Football Championship was the ninth and last edition of the Women's Nordic Football Championship tournament. It was held from 14 July to 18 July in Herning, Kolding and Vejle in Denmark.

Standings

Results

Goalscorers 
3 goals
  Lone Smidt Nielsen
2 goals
  Eva Andersson
  Birgitta Söderström
1 goal
  Annie Gam-Pedersen
  Helene Johansson
  Ulla Kaasinen
  Gunn Lisbeth Nyborg
  Trude Margaret Stendal
  Heidi Støre
  Karin Ödlund

Sources 
Nordic Championships (Women) 1982 Rec.Sport.Soccer Statistics Foundation
Lautela, Yrjö & Wallén, Göran: Rakas jalkapallo — Sata vuotta suomalaista jalkapalloa, p. 419. Football Association of Finland / Teos Publishing 2007. .

Women's Nordic Football Championship
1982–83 in European football
1982 in women's association football
1982–83
Women's football in Denmark
1982 in Norwegian football
1982 in Finnish football
1982 in Swedish football
1982 in Danish football
Nordic
1982 in Danish women's sport